is a Japanese manga artist. She is most famous for creating Junjo Romantica: Pure Romance. Nakamura's distinct style of manga has been identified largely throughout Japanese and English yaoi fanbases. Her works usually include large age gaps between the seme and uke and characters with careers in the publishing industry (as depicted in Junjo Romantica and Sekai-ichi Hatsukoi). She often cowrites with Fujisaki Miyako, who authored the novels of Yoshino Chiaki no baai in Sekai-ichi Hatsukoi.

Works 
 Junjo Romantica: Pure Romance (2002–present)
 "Junjou Mistake" (2008)
 Hybrid Child (2003–2004)
 Sekai-ichi Hatsukoi (2006–present)
 "√W.P.B." (2004)
 "Touzandou Tentsui Ibun" (1998–1999)
 "Mangetsu Monogatari"
 "Tsuki wa Yamiyo ni Kakuru ga Gotoku" (1999)
 "Picturesque of a Mask" (art only)
 "Umi ni Nemuru Hana"

References

External links
 Shungiku Nakamura manga 

Manga artists
Japanese illustrators
Living people
Year of birth missing (living people)